was the 68th emperor of Japan, according to the traditional order of succession.

Go-Ichijō's reign spanned the years from 1016 through 1036.

This 11th century sovereign was named after Emperor Ichijō and go- (後), translates literally as "later;" and thus, he is sometimes called the "Later Emperor Ichijō", or, in some older sources, may be identified as " Emperor Ichijō, the second."

Biography
Before his ascension to the Chrysanthemum Throne, his personal name (imina) was Atsuhira -shinnō (敦成親王).  He was also known as Atsunari-shinnō.

Atsuhira was the second son of Emperor Ichijō.  His mother, Fujiwara no Akiko/Shōshi (藤原彰子) (988–1074), was a daughter of Fujiwara no Michinaga. In her later years, Ichijō's chūgo consort was known as Jōtō-mon In (上東門院).

Events of Go-Ichijō's life
Atsuhira-shinnō was used as a pawn in Imperial court politics when he was only a child.

 1012 (Chōwa 1, 8th month): Prince Atsuhira marries a daughter of sesshō and later kampaku Fujiwara no Michinaga.

Atsuhira became emperor at the age of 8, upon the abdication of his first cousin once removed, Emperor Sanjō.

 March 10, 1016 (Chōwa 5, 29th day of the 1st month): In the 5th year of Emperor Sanjō's reign (三条天皇五年), he abdicated; and the succession (‘‘senso’’) was received by a cousin.  Shortly thereafter, Emperor Go-Ichijō is said to have acceded to the throne (‘‘sokui’’).

During the initial years of Go-Ichijō's reign, Fujiwara no Michinaga actually ruled from his position as sesshō (regent).

 June 5, 1017 (Kannin 1, 9th day of the 5th month): The former-Emperor Sanjō died at the age of 41.
 1017 (Kannin 1, 8th month): Prince Atsuakira, the eldest son of Emperor Sanjo, had been named Crown Prince.  But after he is struck by a skin disease and intense pressure from Michinaga; he withdrew from this role and his younger brother, Prince Atsunaga, was named Crown Prince in his place.
 1017 (Kannin 1, 9th month): Michinaga made a pilgrimage to the Iwashimizu Shrine accompanied by many courtiers.  The travelers divided themselves amongst 15 boats for a floating trip down the Yotogawa River.  One of the vessels overturned, and more than 30 people lost their lives.
 1017 (Kannin 1, 12th month): Michinaga was elevated to the office of Daijō-Diajin.
 May 15, 1036 (Chōgen 9, 17th day of the 4th month): Emperor Go-Ichijō died at the age of 27.

The actual site of Go-Ichijō's grave is known.  This emperor is traditionally venerated at a memorial Shinto shrine (misasagi) at Kyoto.

The Imperial Household Agency designates this location as Go-Ichijō's mausoleum.  It is formally named Bodaijuin no misasagi.

Kugyō
 is a collective term for the very few most powerful men attached to the court of the Emperor of Japan in pre-Meiji eras. Even during those years in which the court's actual influence outside the palace walls was minimal, the hierarchic organization persisted.

In general, this elite group included only three to four men at a time.  These were hereditary courtiers whose experience and background would have brought them to the pinnacle of a life's career.  During Go-Ichijō's reign, this apex of the Daijō-kan included:
 Sesshō, Fujiwara Michinaga, 966–1027.
 Sesshō, Fujiwara Yorimichi, 992–1074.
 Kampaku, Fujiwara Yorimichi.
 Daijō-daijin, Fujiwara Michinaga.
 Daijō-daijin, Kan'in Kinsue, 956–1029.
 Sadaijin, Fujiwara Michinaga.
 Sadaijin, Fujiwara Akimitsu, 944–1021.
 Sadaijin, Fujiwara Yorimichi.
 Udaijin, Fujiwara Sanesuke, 957–1046.
 Nadaijin, Fujiwara Norimichi, 997–1075.
 Dainagon

Eras of Go-Ichijō's reign
The years of Go-Ichijō's reign are more specifically identified by more than one era name or nengō.
 Chōwa        (1012–1017)
 Kannin             (1017–1021)
 Jian    (1021–1024)
 Manju  (1024–1028)
 Chōgen      (1028–1037)

Consort and children

Go-Ichijō had one Empress and two Imperial daughters.

Empress (Chūgū): Fujiwara no Ishi (藤原威子; 999–1036), Fujiwara no Michinaga’s third daughter
 First Daughter: Imperial Princess Akiko/Shōshi (章子内親王) later Nijō-In (二条院), Empress (chūgū) to Emperor Go-Reizei
 Second Daughter: Imperial Princess Kaoruko/Keishi (馨子内親王; 1029–1093) later Saien-no Kogo (西院皇后), Empress (chūgū) to Emperor Go-Sanjō

Ancestry

See also
 Emperor of Japan
 List of Emperors of Japan
 Imperial cult

Notes

References
 Brown, Delmer M. and Ichirō Ishida, eds. (1979).  Gukanshō: The Future and the Past. Berkeley: University of California Press. ;  OCLC 251325323
 Ponsonby-Fane, Richard Arthur Brabazon. (1959).  The Imperial House of Japan. Kyoto: Ponsonby Memorial Society. OCLC 194887
 Titsingh, Isaac. (1834). Nihon Odai Ichiran; ou,  Annales des empereurs du Japon.  Paris: Royal Asiatic Society, Oriental Translation Fund of Great Britain and Ireland.  OCLC 5850691
 Varley, H. Paul. (1980). Jinnō Shōtōki: A Chronicle of Gods and Sovereigns. New York: Columbia University Press. ;  OCLC 59145842

 
 

Japanese emperors
1008 births
1036 deaths
People of Heian-period Japan
11th-century Japanese monarchs
People from Kyoto